Luxempart S.A. is a financial holding company  based in Leudelange, in south-western Luxembourg, it is active primarily in Belgium and its home market of Luxembourg.  It is listed on the Luxembourg Stock Exchange, and is one of the ten (and one of seven Luxembourg-based) companies that make up the exchange's main index, the LuxX Index.

In addition to investing itself, Luxempart owns controlling stakes in two other investment vehicles: a 71.0% stake in Audiolux, which specialises in media investments; and a 51.0% stake in Luxempart-Energie, which invests in energy.  In addition, Luxempart owns a 50% stake in the joint venture private equity firm Indufin.

Investments
This (incomplete) list of investments is correct as of 31 December 2019.

Luxempart
 SES S.A. (2.1%)
 Radio DNR Luxembourg (8.1%)
 Foyer Finance (100%)
 Foyer S.A. (100%)
 Dexia (0.1%)
 Atenor (10.1)
 Paul Wurth (11.0%)
 International Electronics and Engineering (IEE) (10.2%)

Audiolux
 SES S.A. (0.9%)
 RTL Group (0.8%)
 Utopia Group (28.7%)
 Vox Mobile (43.7%)

Luxempart-Energie
 Cegedel (30.4%)
 Société éléctrique de l'Our SA (SEO) (5.0%)

Footnotes

External links
 Luxempart official website

Investment companies of Luxembourg
Leudelange
Financial services companies established in 1988